Roberto Delprado Yulo "Bobby" Enriquez (May 20, 1943 – August 6, 1996) was a jazz pianist from the Philippines. He was called "the Wildman" due to his energetic playing style.

Life
Born in Bacolod City, Negros Occidental, his first love was the piano (he is self-taught since he was 4 years old) but his mother wanted him to concentrate on schoolwork. He started his professional career as a musician at the age of 14, sneaking out of his second floor bedroom window at night to play gigs. When his mother discovered what he was doing, she shut down the piano and told him to concentrate on homework.

He ran away from home and went to Manila. In Manila he joined jazz groups, and from there he played in Taipei and Hong Kong where he met Mel Tormé, Lionel Hampton, Tito Puente, and Chico Hamilton. He got a job at the Golden Dragon Lounge in Honolulu. In Hawaii he became music director for Don Ho. From 1976 to 1977 he performed with Amapola Cabase in San Francisco, California. This was followed by appearances at the Wagon Wheel and Harrah's Hotel in Lake Tahoe, Nevada.

From 1980 to 1981, he was a sideman for Richie Cole on tour. During the next four years he made several albums for GNP Crescendo.

Enriquez became a born-again Christian in 1993 and spoke of how God had changed his life. He played jazzy hymns at his church in Bayonne, New Jersey. He died at age 53 due to pulmonary embolism on August 6, 1996 in Stayton, Oregon.

Discography

As leader

As sideman
With Maria Amapola Cabase
 Sophisticated Lady

References

1943 births
1996 deaths
20th-century American pianists
American jazz pianists
American male pianists
American musicians of Filipino descent
Filipino Christians
Filipino emigrants to the United States
Filipino jazz pianists
GNP Records artists
Musicians from Hawaii
Musicians from Los Angeles
Musicians from Negros Occidental
Musicians from New Jersey
Jazz musicians from California
20th-century American male musicians
American male jazz musicians